Asphodelus tenuifolius is a species of plant in the asphodel family Asphodelaceae. It is native to North Africa, Southern Europe, the Middle East and South Asia. It has been introduced to Australia and the Mascarene Islands. It is generally present from the Canary Islands, across the Mediterranean to the Middle East and Afghanistan. It has a fibrous root system. It is also known as wild onion or "jungli piyaz" in Pakistan.

References

Asphodeloideae
Plants described in 1801
Flora of Western Asia
Flora of North Africa
Taxa named by Antonio José Cavanilles